Peter Joseph Brady Sr. (born May 24, 1962) is an American labor leader and Democratic Party politician who served as a member of the Vermont House of Representatives. In May 1995, following state representative Timothy R. Corcoran's resignation to become Bennington town clerk, Governor Howard Dean appointed Brady, then a vice president of the Vermont Labor Council, to serve the remainder of Corcoran's term. He won election to a full term in 1996 alongside Republican Mary A. Morrissey.

Electoral history

References

External links

1962 births
Living people
Politicians from Brooklyn
People from Bennington, Vermont
Democratic Party members of the Vermont House of Representatives
20th-century American politicians